This is a list of banks in Belarus.

The National Bank of the Republic of Belarus is the central bank of Belarus.

Complete list as of July 28, 2022.

References

Banks
Belarus
Belarus